The Hajen class (Shark class) was a submarine class built by Kockums and used by the Swedish Navy. The design was influenced by the German Type XXI submarine class. A total of 6 submarines were built in 1954-1958  and were kept in service until 1980.

References
 Conway's All the World's Fighting Ships 1947-1995

Submarine classes